Barry Smolin (born April 20, 1961), also known as Mr. Smolin, is an American radio host, teacher, composer, and writer. He last taught at Alexander Hamilton High School in Los Angeles, and is the host of a radio program on KPFK.

Career

Radio

The Music Never Stops
From 1995 to 2012, Smolin was the host of The Music Never Stops, a psychedelic radio show on KPFK in Los Angeles, California for which Smolin won the first ever Jammy Award for "Best Radio Show" in 2000. Smolin's program was also nominated for an LA Weekly Music Award in 2004 in the "Best Radio Show" category. The Music Never Stops began as a program featuring live recordings of the Grateful Dead, but after the death of Jerry Garcia; Smolin expanded the scope of the show to include contemporary jam-rock and miscellaneous psychedelia, paying special attention to music being made by musicians in Los Angeles. The program has been covered in Relix magazine and Jambands.com.

Head Room
Smolin is currently the host of the program Head Room on KPFK, heard every Sunday night from 8–10.

Teaching
Smolin's teaching career has been featured in articles in Time and the Los Angeles Times, as well as in the Larchmont Chronicle, and the Library Foundation of L.A.'s "My Moby-Dick" tribute. From 1987 to 1992, Smolin taught English at Fairfax High School (the school Smolin himself graduated from in 1978) in the Los Angeles Unified School District. Since leaving Fairfax in 1992, he was on the faculty at Alexander Hamilton High School, teaching English in the Hamilton Humanities Magnet program until 2021.

Music

Pop music

As a songwriter, Smolin has composed music for the Showtime television series Weeds, with his song "The Earth Keeps Turning On" appearing in Season 3's Episode 7, entitled "He Taught Me How to Drive By" as well as on the Weeds Season 3 soundtrack album. Under the performance moniker Mr. Smolin he has released four albums, At Apogee (2004) and The Crumbling Empire of White People (2007) (both produced by Tony Award-winning composer/dramatist Stew), a Los Angeles song cycle entitled Bring Back The Real Don Steele (2009), and a collaboration with Double Naught Spy Car entitled Heaven's Not High (2013). In 2015, Smolin released two singles: "Fairfax High School", about his alma mater, and "The Man I Met Once".

Experimental music

Since 2016, Smolin has primarily composed experimental pieces, both instrumental and spoken word. With Double Naught Spy Car, he set chapter 1 of James Joyce's Finnegans Wake to music as part of the Waywords and Meansigns project, which was released in 2016 as was an album of the project's instrumental tracks called That Tragoady Thundersday. In September 2017, he released an instrumental album entitled The Sooterkin Library, a trio project that Smolin describes as "12-tone avant-freak mongrel psycho-tonk".

Writing
Smolin is the author of two novellas: Narcissus in the Dark (2012), whose narrator is God sentenced to eternity in a dungeon and whose consciousness thinks new universes into being while sorting through the detritus of his troubled past, and the experimental prose project Wake Up in the Dreamhouse, composed one sentence at a time on Twitter. In May 2011, Smolin released a volume of selected poetry covering 1988 to 2010 entitled Always Be Madly in Love. His most recent fiction project is a trilogy entitled The Miranda Complex, Volume 1 of which was published in 2016 with Volume 2 following in 2017, and the concluding Volume 3 in 2018. The Miranda Complex chronicles the unconsummated romantic relationship between Lance Atlas and Miranda Savitch, two teenagers in 1970s Los Angeles.

Discography

Bibliography
Wake Up In The Dreamhouse (2011)
Always Be Madly In Love (2011)
Narcissus In The Dark (2012)
The Miranda Complex Volume 1: Munchkinland (2016)
The Miranda Complex Volume 2: Poppies (2017)
The Miranda Complex Volume 3: The Man Behind The Curtain (2018)

References

External links

Head Room website

American singer-songwriters
American rock songwriters
American rock singers
Schoolteachers from California
California State University, Northridge alumni
Radio personalities from Los Angeles
Writers from Los Angeles
University of California, Los Angeles alumni
1961 births
Living people